Innsbruck is the capital of Tyrol and the fifth-largest city in Austria. On the River Inn, at its junction with the Wipp Valley, which provides access to the Brenner Pass  to the south, it had a population of 132,493 in 2018.

In the broad valley between high mountains, the so-called North Chain in the Karwendel Alps (Hafelekarspitze) to the north and Patscherkofel and Serles to the south, Innsbruck is an internationally renowned winter sports centre; it hosted the 1964 and 1976 Winter Olympics as well as the 1984 and 1988 Winter Paralympics. It also hosted the first Winter Youth Olympics in 2012. The name means "bridge over the Inn".

History

Antiquity
The earliest traces suggest initial inhabitation in the early Stone Age. Surviving pre-Roman place names show that the area has been populated continuously. In the 4th century the Romans established the army station Veldidena (the name survives in today's urban district Wilten) at Oenipons (Innsbruck), to protect the economically important commercial road from Verona-Brenner-Augsburg in their province of Raetia.

The first mention of Innsbruck dates back to the name Oeni Pontum or Oeni Pons which is Latin for bridge (pons) over the Inn (Oenus), which was an important crossing point over the Inn river. The Counts of Andechs acquired the town in 1180. In 1248 the town passed into the hands of the Counts of Tyrol. The city's arms show a bird's-eye view of the Inn bridge, a design used since 1267. The route over the Brenner Pass was then a major transport and communications link between the north and the south of Europe, and the easiest route across the Alps.  It was part of the Via Imperii, a medieval imperial road under special protection of the king. The revenues generated by serving as a transit station on this route enabled the city to flourish.

Early History

Innsbruck became the capital of all Tyrol in 1429 and in the 15th century the city became a centre of European politics and culture as Emperor Maximilian I also resided in Innsbruck in the 1490s. The city benefited from the emperor's presence as can be seen for example in the Hofkirche. Here a funeral monument for Maximilian was planned and erected partly by his successors. The ensemble with a cenotaph and the bronze statues of real and mythical ancestors of the Habsburg emperor are one of the main artistic monuments of Innsbruck. A regular postal service between Innsbruck and Mechelen was established in 1490 by the Thurn-und-Taxis-Post.

In 1564 Ferdinand II, Archduke of Austria received the rulership over Tirol and other Further Austrian possessions administered from Innsbruck up to the 18th century. He had Schloss Ambras built and arranged there his unique Renaissance collections nowadays mainly part of Vienna's Kunsthistorisches Museum. Up to 1665 a stirps of the Habsburg dynasty ruled in Innsbruck with an independent court. In the 1620s the first opera house north of the Alps was erected in Innsbruck (Dogana).

In 1669 the university was founded. Also as a compensation for the court as Emperor Leopold I again reigned from Vienna and the Tyrolean stirps of the Habsburg dynasty had ended in 1665.

During the Napoleonic Wars Tyrol was ceded to Bavaria, ally of France. Andreas Hofer led a Tyrolean peasant army to victory in the Battles of Bergisel against the combined Bavarian and French forces, and then made Innsbruck the centre of his administration. The combined army later overran the Tyrolean militia army and until 1814 Innsbruck was part of Bavaria. After the Vienna Congress Austrian rule was restored. Until 1918, the town (one of the 4 autonomous towns in Tyrol) was part of the Austrian monarchy (Austria side after the compromise of 1867), head of the district of the same name, one of the 21 Bezirkshauptmannschaften in the Tyrol province.

The Tyrolean hero Andreas Hofer was executed in Mantua; his remains were returned to Innsbruck in 1823 and interred in the Franciscan church.

During World War I, the only recorded action taking place in Innsbruck was near the end of the war. On February 20, 1918, Allied planes flying out of Italy raided Innsbruck, causing casualties among the Austrian troops there. No damage to the town is recorded. In November 1918 Innsbruck and all Tyrol were occupied by the 20 to 22 thousand soldiers of the III Corps of the First Italian Army.

In 1929, the first official Austrian Chess Championship was held in Innsbruck.

Annexation and bombing

In 1938 Austria was annexed by Nazi Germany in the Anschluss. Between 1943 and April 1945, Innsbruck experienced twenty-two air raids and suffered heavy damage.

Euroregion Tyrol-South Tyrol-Trentino
In 1996, the European Union approved further cultural and economic integration between the Austrian province of Tyrol and the Italian autonomous provinces of South Tyrol and Trentino by recognizing the creation of the Euroregion Tyrol-South Tyrol-Trentino.

Geography

Climate 
Innsbruck has a humid continental climate (Köppen Dfb) using  isotherm or oceanic climate (Cfb) using the original  isotherm since it has larger annual temperature differences than most of Central Europe due to its location in the centre of the Continent and its position around mountainous terrains. Winters are often very cold (colder than those of most major European cities) and snowy, although the foehn wind sometimes brings pronounced thaws.

Summer is highly variable and unpredictable. Days can be cool  and rainy, or sunny and extremely hot, sometimes hitting .

Boroughs and statistical divisions

Innsbruck is divided into nine boroughs (cadastral settlements) that were formed from previously independent municipalities or villages. These nine boroughs are further divided into twenty wards (cadastral districts). All wards are within one borough, except for the ward of Hungerburg (Upper Innsbruck), which is divided between two. For statistical purposes, Innsbruck is further divided into forty-two statistical units (Statistischer Bezirk) and 178 numbered blocks (Zählsprengel).

The following are the nine boroughs with the population as of 31 October 2011:
 Innsbruck (inner city) (18.524), consisting of Oldtown (Altstadt), Dreiheiligen-Schlachthof, and Saggen
 Wilten (15.772), consisting of Mentlberg, Sieglanger, and Wilten West
 Pradl (30.890), consisting of Pradler-Saggen, Reichenau, and Tivoli 
 Hötting (31.246), consisting of Höttinger Au, Hötting West, Sadrach, Allerheiligen, Kranebitten, and part of Hungerburg
 Mühlau (4.750), consisting of part of Hungerburg
 Amras (5.403), consisting of Roßau
 Arzl (10.293), consisting of Neuarzl and Olympisches Dorf
 Vill (535)
 Igls (2.204)

Places of interest

Mountains 

 Nordkette
 Patscherkofel

Buildings and monuments 

 Old Inn Bridge (Alte Innbrücke)
 Ambras Castle
 Andreas Hofer's tomb
 St. Anne's Column (Annasäule)
 Bergisel Ski Jump
 Büchsenhausen Castle
 Canisianum
Casino
 City Hall (Stadtsaal)
 Golden Roof (Goldenes Dachl)
 Helbling House (Helblinghaus)
 Imperial Palace (Hofburg)
 Hungerburgbahn
 Leopold Fountain (Leopoldsbrunnen)
 Maria-Theresien-Straße
 Maximilian's Cenotaph and the Black Men (Schwarzen Männer)
 Old Federal State Parliament (Altes Landhaus)
 Old Town (Altstadt)
 Silver Chapel (Silberne Kapelle)
 City Tower (Stadtturm)
 Triumphal Arch (Triumphpforte)
 Tyrolean State Theatre

Museums 

 Alpine Club Museum
 Ambras Castle
 Armoury
 City Archives
 Grassmayr Bell Foundry and Museum
 Innsbruck Stubaital station
 Kaiserjäger Museum
 Tyrol Panorama Museum (Das Tirol Panorama)
 Tyrolean Folk Art Museum (Tiroler Volkunstmuseum)
 Tyrolean State Museum (Tiroler Landesmuseum or Ferdinandeum)
 Tyrolean Museum Railways (Tiroler Museumsbahnen)

Churches 

 Court Church (Hofkirche)
 Innsbruck Cathedral (Dom zu St. Jakob)
 Old Ursuline Church
 Jesuit Church
 Church of Our Lady 
 Church of Our Lady of Perpectual Succour
 Servite Church
 Hospital Church
 Ursuline Church
 Wilten Abbey (Stift Wilten)
 Wilten Basilica (Wiltener Basilika)
 Holy Trinity Church
 St. John's Church
 St. Theresa's Church (Hungerburg)
 Pradler Parish Church
 St. Paul's State Memorial Church in the Reichenau
 Evangelical Church of Christ
 Evangelical Church of the Resurrection
 Old Höttingen Parish Church
 Höttingen Parish Church
 Parish Church of St. Nicholas
 Parish Church of Neu-Arzl
 Parish Church of St. Norbert
 Parish Church of Maria am Gestade
 Parish Church of the Good Shepherd
 Parish Church of St. George
 Parish Church of St. Paul
 Parish Church of St. Pirminius
 Church of the Guardian Angel

Parks and gardens 
 Alpine Zoo (Alpenzoo)
 Baggersee Innsbruck
 Innsbruck University Botanic Garden
 Hofgarten (Court Garden)
 Rapoldi-Weiher Park
 Ambras Castle Park (Schlosspark Ambras)

Gallery

Government and politics 

The results of the 2018 local elections were:
 Austrian Green Party 24.16% (left)
 Freedom Party of Austria 18.56% (right)
 Für Innsbruck 16.15% (conservative)
 Austrian People's Party 12.17% (conservative)
 Social Democratic Party of Austria 10.32% (left)
 NEOS – The New Austria and Liberal Forum 4.73% (center)
 Bürgerforum Tirol – Liste Fritz (FRITZ) 3.23%
 Gerechtes Innsbruck (Gerecht) 3.10%
 Tiroler Seniorenbund – Für Alt und Jung (TSB) 2.72%
 Alternative Liste Innsbruck (ALI) 2.38%

Culture

Cultural events 

Innsbruck is a very popular tourist destination, organizing the following events every year:
 Innsbrucker Tanzsommer
 Bergsilvester (New Year's Eve)
 Innsbrucker Festwochen der Alten Musik (Innsbruck Festival of Early Music)
 Christkindlmarkt (Christmas fair)

In 1971, author Douglas Adams was inspired to write the internationally successful The Hitchhiker's Guide to the Galaxy series while lying intoxicated in a field in Innsbruck. From 2003 onwards each year Towel Day is celebrated worldwide on May 25.

Sports 

Due to its location between high mountains, Innsbruck serves as an ideal place for skiing in winter, ski-jumping and mountaineering in summer. There are several ski resorts around Innsbruck, with the Nordkette served by a cable car and additional chair lifts further up. Other ski resorts nearby include Axamer Lizum, Muttereralm, Patscherkofel, Igls, Seefeld, Tulfes and Stubai Valley. The glaciated terrain in the latter makes skiing possible even in summer months.

The Winter Olympic Games were held in Innsbruck twice, first in 1964, then again in 1976, when Colorado voters rejected a bond referendum in 1972 to finance the Denver games, originally awarded in 1970. The 1976 Winter Olympics were the last games held in the German-speaking Alps (Austria, Germany, or Switzerland).

Along with St. Moritz, Switzerland and Lake Placid, New York in the United States, it is one of three places which have twice hosted the Winter Games. It also hosted the 1984 and 1988 Winter Paralympics.

Innsbruck hosted the 1st Winter Youth Olympic Games in 2012.

Innsbruck also hosts one of the 4 ski-jumping competitions of the 4 Hills Tournament every year.
 
Other notable events held in Innsbruck include the Air & Style Snowboard Contest from 1994 to 1999 and 2008 and the Ice Hockey World Championship in 2005. Together with the city of Seefeld, Innsbruck organized the Winter Universiade in 2005. Innsbruck's Bergiselschanze is one of the hills of the famous Four Hills Tournament.

Innsbruck is home to the football club FC Wacker Innsbruck, which plays in the Austrian Football Second League as of the 2019–20 season. Former teams include the FC Swarovski Tirol and FC Tirol Innsbruck. FC Wacker Innsbruck's stadium, Tivoli Neu, is one of eight stadiums which hosted Euro 2008 which took place in Switzerland and Austria in June 2008.

The city also hosted an American Football final, Eurobowl XXII between the Swarco Raiders Tirol and the Raiffeisen Vikings Vienna.

The city hosted opening round games in the 2011 IFAF World Championship, the official international American Football championship.

In 2018 Innsbruck hosted the IFSC Climbing World Championships 2018 from September 6 to September 16 and the 2018 UCI Road World Championships from September 22 to September 30.

Language 
Innsbruck is part of the Austro-Bavarian region of dialects and, more specifically, Southern Bavarian (Südbairisch). Irina Windhaber, professor for linguistics at the Universität Innsbruck, has observed a trend among young people to choose more often Standard German language structures and pronunciation.

Economy and infrastructure 
Innsbruck is a substantial tourist centre, with more than a million overnight stays.

In Innsbruck, there are 86,186 employees and about 12,038 employers. 7,598 people are self-employed. Nearly 35,000 people commute every day into Innsbruck from the surrounding communities in the area. The unemployment rate for the year 2012 was 4.2%.

The national statistics office, Statistik Austria, does not produce economic data for the City of Innsbruck alone, but on aggregate level with the Innsbruck-Land District summarized as NUTS 3-region Innsbruck. In 2013, GDP per capita in the NUTS 3-region Innsbruck was €41,400 which is around 60% above the EU average.

The headquarters of Tiroler Wasserkraft (Tiwag, energy production), Bank für Tirol und Vorarlberg (financial services), Tiroler Versicherung (insurance) and MED-EL (medical devices) are located in Innsbruck. The headquarters of Swarovski (glass), Felder Group (mechanical engineering) and Swarco (traffic technology) are located within  from the city.

Residential property is very expensive by national standards. The average price per square metre in Innsbruck is €4,430  (2015), which is the second highest per square metre price among Austrian cities surpassed only by Salzburg (€4,823), but followed by Vienna (€3,980).

Transport 

Innsbruck is located along the A12/A13 highway corridor (Inn Valley Autobahn and Brenner Autobahn respectively), providing freeway access to Verona, Italy and Munich, Germany. The A12 and A13 converge near Innsbruck, at which point the A13 terminates.

Innsbruck Hauptbahnhof, the most important railway station of Innsbruck and Tyrol, is one of the busiest railway stations in Austria. It is served by the Lower Inn Valley line to Germany and eastern Austria, the Arlberg line to the west and the Brenner line, which connects northern Italy with southern Germany via the Brenner pass. Since December 2007 suburban services have been operated as the Innsbruck S-Bahn.

Innsbruck Airport is located in the suburb of Kranebitten, which is located in the west of the city. It provides services to airports including Frankfurt, London, Amsterdam and Vienna. It also handles regional flights around the Alps, as well as seasonal flights to other destinations. During the winter, activity increases significantly, due to the high number of skiers travelling to the region.

Local public transport is provided by Innsbrucker Verkehrsbetriebe (IVB), a public authority operating a network of bus and tram routes.  The metre-gauge tram network consists of four city lines, 1, 2, 3 and 5, and two lines serving the surrounding area: , the Innsbrucker Mittelgebirgsbahn to Igls, and line STB, the Stubaitalbahn running through the Stubai Valley to Fulpmes. The network is planned to be enlarged during the coming years to reach the neighboring village Rum in the east and Völs in the west. Numerous bus lines serve the inner city and connect it with surrounding areas. Until 2007 the bus network included two trolleybus routes, but these were abandoned in preparation for planned expansion of the tram network.

In December 2007, the Hungerburgbahn, a funicular service to the district of Hungerburg, was reopened after a two-year closure for extensive rebuilding, with partial realignment and a new extension across the Inn River and into central Innsbruck.  The line was also equipped with new vehicles. Because of the unique design of the stations, drafted by the famous architect Zaha Hadid, the funicular evolves immediately to a new emblem of the city. The line was rebuilt by the Italian company Leitner, and can now carry up to 1,200 persons per hour. It is operated by a private company, the 'Innsbrucker Nordkettenbahnen'.

Education 
Innsbruck is a university city, with several locally based colleges and universities.

Innsbruck is home to the oldest grammar school (Gymnasium) of Western Austria, the "Akademisches Gymnasium Innsbruck". The school was founded in 1562 by the Jesuit order and was the precursor of the university, founded in 1669.

Innsbruck hosts several universities. The most well-known are the University of Innsbruck (Leopold-Franzens-Universität), the Innsbruck Medical University, and the university of applied sciences MCI Management Center Innsbruck.

Organizations 
 The international headquarters of SOS Children's Villages, one of the world's largest charities, is located in Innsbruck.
 The internationally active NGO Austrian Service Abroad was founded in Innsbruck in 1992 by Andreas Maislinger and Andreas Hörtnagl. Its central office is located at Hutterweg, Innsbruck.
 Innsbruck has two universities, the Leopold-Franzens-Universität Innsbruck and the Innsbruck Medical University. The Innsbruck Medical University has one of Europe's premier ski injury clinics.
 The international headquarters of MED-EL, one of the largest producers of cochlear implants, is located in Innsbruck.
 The Aouda.X space suit simulator is being developed by the OeWF in Innsbruck. Also, the Mission Support Centre for many of the OeWF Mars analogue missions is situated in the city. This MSC used time delayed communication with Camp Weyprecht in the desert near Erfoud, Morocco for the MARS2013 expedition during February 2013.

Notable residents

Monarchy & Aristocracy 
 Frederick III, Holy Roman Emperor (1415 – 1493), Holy Roman Emperor from 1452 until his death, the first emperor of the House of Habsburg.
 Margaret of Austria, Electress of Saxony (c. 1416–1486), member of the House of Habsburg, was Electress of Saxony 1431-1464 by her marriage with the Wettin elector Frederick II. She was a sister of Emperor Frederick III.
 Sigismund, Archduke of Austria (1427–1496), Habsburg archduke of Austria and ruler of Tirol from 1446 to 1490
 Elisabeth of Brandenburg (1510 – 1558), princess of the House of Hohenzollern and a Margravine of Brandenburg
 Antoine Perrenot de Granvelle (1517–1586), Comte de La Baume Saint Amour, Burgundian statesman,  followed his father as a leading minister of the Spanish Habsburgs.
 Catherine of Austria, Queen of Poland (1533 – 1572), one of the fifteen children of Ferdinand I, Holy Roman Emperor and Anna of Bohemia and Hungary
 Anna of Tyrol (1585–1618), by birth Archduchess of Austria and member of the Tyrolese branch of the House of Habsburg and by marriage Holy Roman Empress
 Archduchess Isabella Clara of Austria (1629–1685), by birth Archduchess of Austria as a member of the Tyrolese branch of the House of Habsburg
 Sigismund Francis, Archduke of Austria (1630–1665), ruler of Further Austria including Tyrol 
 Maria Leopoldine of Austria-Tyrol (1632–1649), by birth Archduchess of Austria and member of the Tyrolese branch of the House of Habsburg and by marriage the second spouse of her first cousin, Holy Roman Emperor Ferdinand III
 Archduchess Claudia Felicitas of Austria (1653–1676), by birth Archduchess of Austria and by marriage Holy Roman Empress and the second wife of Leopold I
 Leopold, Duke of Lorraine Leopold (1679 – 1729), surnamed the Good, was Duke of Lorraine and Bar from 1690
 Ignaz Anton von Indermauer (1759–1796), nobleman who was murdered in a peasant revolt
 Henry Taaffe, 12th Viscount Taaffe (1872–1928), landowner, held hereditary titles from Austria & Ireland until 1919 when he lost both; son of Eduard Taaffe, 11th Viscount Taaffe.
 Prince Johannes Heinrich of Saxe-Coburg and Gotha (1931 in Innsbruck – 2010), prince of the House of Saxe-Coburg and Gotha-Koháry

Public Service 

 Eusebio Kino (1645 – 1711), Jesuit missionary & explorer of Northwest Mexico & Southwest USA, student and later teacher at Akademisches Gymnasium Innsbruck.
 Josef Speckbacher (1767-1820) a leading figure in the rebellion of the Tyrol against Napoleon
 Joseph Hormayr, Baron zu Hortenburg (1781/2–1848) statesman & historian.
 Hermann von Gilm (1812–1864) lawyer and poet
 Vinzenz Maria Gredler (1823 in Telfs – 1912) a Dominican friar, classicist, philosopher theologian and naturalist
 Ignatius Klotz (1843–1911), American farmer and politician in Wisconsin
 Oswald Redlich (1858–1944) historian and archivist of auxiliary sciences of history
 Heinrich Schenkl (1859–1919) classical philologist, son of Karl Schenkl
 Diana Budisavljević (1891–1978), humanitarian who led a major relief effort in Yugoslavia during World War II 
 Blessed Jakob Gapp (1897-1943) Roman Catholic priest and a Marianists.
 Karl Gruber (1909 – 1995) an Austrian politician and diplomat
 Reinhold Stecher (1921–2013) prelate of the Roman Catholic Church. Bishop of the Diocese of Innsbruck 1980 to 1997.
 Professor Dr. Christian Schwarz-Schilling (born 1930 in Innsbruck) a German politician, entrepreneur, philanthropist and media and telecommunications innovator.
 Marcello Spatafora (born 1941), Italian diplomat, former Permanent Representative of Italy to the United Nations
 Gerhard Pfanzelter (born 1943 in Innsbruck) prominent Austrian diplomat.
 Andreas Maislinger (born 1955) Austrian historian and founder of the Austrian Holocaust Memorial Service
 Christoph Hofinger (born 1967) researcher and political consultant
 Gabriel Kuhn (born 1972), political writer and translator based in Sweden
 René Benko (born 1977), real estate investor and founder of Signa Holding

War figures 
 Raoul Stojsavljevic (1887 in Innsbruck - 1930) World War I flying ace 
 Otto Hofmann (1896–1982), SS-Obergruppenführer director of Nazi Germany's "Race and Settlement Main Office", sentenced to 25 years for war crimes in 1948, pardoned 1954
 Robert Bernardis (1908–1944) resistance fighter, part of the attempt to kill Adolf Hitler in the 20 July Plot in 1944.
 Anton Malloth (1912 – 2002) a supervisor in the Theresienstadt concentration camp.
 Constanze Manziarly (1920-1945) cook/dietitian to Adolf Hitler until his final days in 1945

Arts 

 Jacob Regnart (1540s–1599) Flemish Renaissance composer of sacred and secular music
 William Young (died 1662) English viol player and composer of the Baroque era, who worked at the court of Ferdinand Charles, Archduke of Austria in Innsbruck
 Johann Paul Schor (1615–1674), artist, known in Rome as "Giovanni Paolo Tedesco" 
 Michael Ignaz Mildorfer (1690–1747), painter, painted primarily religious themed works
 Josef Ignaz Mildorfer (1719–1775), painter of frescoes
 Franz Edmund Weirotter (1733–1771), painter, draughtsman and etcher primarily of landscapes and maritime scenes
 Georg Mader (1824 – 1881) an Austrian painter.
 Edgar Meyer (1853–1925), painter, built himself a castle and engaged in politics
 Karl Schönherr (1867 - 1943) Austrian writer of Austrian Heimat themes.
 Mimi Gstöttner-Auer (1886–1977) Austrian stage and film actress 
 Clemens Holzmeister (1886–1983), architect and stage designer
 Erwin Faber (1891–1989), leading actor in Munich and Germany, in the late-1970s he performed at the Residenz Theatre
 Igo Sym (1896–1941), Austrian-born Polish actor and collaborator with Nazi Germany
 Carl-Heinz Schroth (1902–1989), actor and film director, appeared in 60 films 
 Heinrich C. Berann (1915–1999) father of the modern panorama map, born into a family of painters and sculptors
 Peter Demant (1918 in Innsbruck – 2006) a Russian writer and public figure.
 Judith Holzmeister (1920–2008) actress, married to the actor Curd Jürgens 1947–1955 
 Otmar Suitner (1922–2010) conductor who spent most of his professional career in East Germany, Principal Conductor of the Staatskapelle Dresden from 1960 to 1964
 Dietmar Schönherr (1926–2014) an Austrian film actor 
 Ilse von Alpenheim (born 1927) pianist
 William Berger (born 1928 in Innsbruck - 1993) was an Austrian American actor 
 Erich Urbanner (born 1936 in Innsbruck) Austrian composer and teacher.
 Peter Noever (born 1941 in Innsbruck) designer and curator–at–large of art and architecture
 Christian Berger (born 1945) Austrian cinematographer
 Radu Malfatti (born 1946), trombone player and composer
 Helga Anders (1948 – 1986) Austrian television actress 
 Reed Gratz (born 1950), Jazz pianist/composer, Professor at University of Innsbruck 
 Gabriele Sima (1955–2016), opera singer 
 Norbert Pümpel (born 1956 Innsbruck) a visual artist.
 Gabriele Fontana (born 1958 Innsbruck) an Austrian operatic soprano.
 Thomas Larcher (born 1963 in Innsbruck) an Austrian composer and pianist.
 Armin Wolf (born 1966), journalist and television anchor
 Eva Lind (born 1966), operatic soprano 
 Aleksandar Marković (born 1975) Serbian, principal conductor of Tyrolean Opera House
 Alice Tumler (born 1978), television presenter 
 Georg Neuhauser (born 1982), singer in Serenity (band)
 Manu Delago (born 1984), Hang player, percussionist and composer based in London
 Amira El Sayed (born Innsbruck 1991) an Egyptian-Austrian actress and author
 Nathan Trent (born 1992) singer for Austria in the Eurovision Song Contest 2017
 Victoria Swarovski (born Innsbruck 1994), singer, TV Presenter Let's Dance Germany, Billionaire Heiress of the Swarovski empire

Science 

 Adam Tanner (1572–1632) Jesuit professor of maths and philosophy, eponym of the moon crater Tannerus
 Ferdinand Johann Adam von Pernau, Count of Rosenau (1660–1731) Austrian ornithologist
 Johann Nepomuk von Laicharting (1754–1797), entomologist and Professor of Natural Science
 Wilibald Swibert Joseph Gottlieb von Besser (1784–1842), Austrian-born botanist who mainly worked in western Ukraine
 Philipp Sarlay (1826 - 1908) principal of telegraph office, technological and scientific pioneer
 Leopold Pfaundler (1839–1920), physicist and chemist, wrote the kinetic theory of gases
 Georg Luger (1849 – 1923) an Austrian designer of the famous Luger pistol
 Erwin Payr (1871–1946), surgeon, eponym of Splenic-flexure syndrome or "Payr's disease"
 Meinhard von Pfaundler (1872–1947), pediatrician, interest in the diathetic aspects of disease
 Arnold Durig (1872 – 1961) Austrian physiologist, investigated organisms at high altitude
 Otto E. Neugebauer (1899–1990) Austrian-American mathematician and historian of science
 Bruno de Finetti (1906–1985), Italian probabilist, statistician and actuary, noted for the conception of probability
 Meinhard Michael Moser (1924–2002) mycologist of the taxonomy, chemistry and toxicity of the gilled mushrooms
 Klaus Riedle (born 1941 in Innsbruck) German power engineering scientist, contributed to the development of more efficient gas turbines for power generation
 Prof. Herbert Lochs (1946 – 2015) prominent German/Austrian medical doctor and scientist
 Peter Zoller (born Innsbruck 1952) theoretical physicist and Professor at the University of Innsbruck
 Wolfgang Scheffler (born 1956), inventor/promoter of large, flexible, parabolic reflecting dishes that concentrate sunlight for cooking and in the world's first solar-powered crematorium
 Christian Spielmann (born 1963), physicist and a professor at the University of Jena

Sport 

 Hady Pfeiffer (1906–2002), Austrian/German alpine skier, competed 1936 Winter Olympics
 Roderich Menzel (1907–1987), amateur tennis player and, after his active career, an author
 Lotte Scheimpflug (1908–?), Austrian/Italian luger, competed 1920s to the 1950s
 Gustav Lantschner (1910–2011), alpine skier & actor, competed 1936 Winter Olympics
 Erich Eliskases (1913–1997), chess grandmaster of the 1930s and 1940s, represented Austria, Germany and Argentina
 Hermann Buhl (1924–1957) mountaineer, considered one of the best climbers of all time
 Egon Schöpf (born 1925) alpine skier, competed in the 1948 and 1952 Winter Olympics
 Dagmar Rom (born 1928) a former alpine ski racer, won two gold medals at the 1950 World Championships
 Walter Steinegger (born 1928) former ski jumper who competed in the 1952 Winter Olympics
 Fritz Dinkhauser (born 1940) hammer thrower and bobsleigher at the 1968 Winter Olympics
 Gert Elsässer (born 1949), skeleton racer who competed in the early 1980s
 Franz Marx (born 1963), sport wrestler, qualified for the Summer Olympic Games in Barcelona 
 Markus Prock (born 1964), luger who competed between 1983 and 2002
 Barbara Schett (born 1976) Austrian tennis player and sportscaster
 Fritz Dopfer (born 1987) World Cup alpine ski racer, specializing in the giant slalom and slalom
 David Lama (1990–2019) Rock climber and mountaineer.
 René Binder (born 1992), racing driver
 Nicol Ruprecht (born 1992), rhythmic gymnast 
 Susanna Kurzthaler (born 1995), biathlete
 Vanessa Herzog (born 1995), speed skater
 Gregor Schlierenzauer (born Innsbruck 1994), Ski jumper, all-time leader in the number of World Cup victories

International relations

Twin towns and sister cities 
 Freiburg im Breisgau in Baden-Württemberg, Germany (since 1963)
 Grenoble in Isère, Auvergne-Rhône-Alpes, France (since 1963)
 Sarajevo in Bosnia and Herzegovina (since 1980)
 Aalborg in Denmark (since 1982)
 Tbilisi in Georgia (since 1982)
  Ōmachi in Japan,  (since 1985)
 New Orleans, Louisiana, United States (since 1995)

Partnerships 
 Kraków in Lesser Poland Voivodeship, Poland (since 1998)

Austrian Service Abroad 
The Austrian Service Abroad is a NGO, which provides positions for an alternative Austrian national service at 85 organizations in 35 countries worldwide in the sectors Holocaust Memorial Service, Social Service and Peace Service. It was founded by Andreas Maislinger and Andreas Hörtnagl in 1998 and is based in Innsbruck.

See also 
Tyrol
History of the Jews in Innsbruck
Innsbruck, ich muss dich lassen
Internationales Studentenhaus Innsbruck
Innsbruck Tramway
Music of Innsbruck
Lohbach (Inn)

References 
Citations

Bibliography

Further reading
Published in the 19th century

Published in the 20th century

External links 

Innsbruck.at – official site
Innsbruck.info – Tourist Board
tirolerabend.info – Tyrolean Evening Shows in Innsbruck
IVB – Public Transport Official Site
Innsbruck Photos 2008
Collection of photograph of Hafelekar mountain above Innsbruck
www.provinnsbruck.at – Community blog
www.all-inn.at – Innsbruck Stadtguide

 
Austrian state capitals
Cities and towns in Tyrol (state)
Districts of Tyrol (state)
Populated places on the Inn (river)